The Philadelphia Sphas, also stylized SPHAs or SPHAS, were an American basketball franchise that existed in professional, semi-professional, and exhibition forms. They played their home games in the ballroom of Philadelphia's Broadwood Hotel. The team's name is an acronym, derived from South Philadelphia Hebrew Association (the group that initially funded the team), and the team's players, at least in its earlier years, were primarily Jewish. Future Philadelphia Warriors owner Eddie Gottlieb founded the team as an amateur group shortly after he and some close friends graduated from high school, and it later became a professional team. The Sphas played in many leagues around the Philadelphia area and the East Coast, most notably the Eastern Basketball League and the American Basketball League (ABL), between which the Sphas won 10 championships. The Sphas won a total of 12 championships, their first two coming from the early Philadelphia League and Philadelphia Basket Ball League.

History

Origins as YMHA
The Sphas' existence began in 1917 as an amateur team by neighborhood friends Eddie Gottlieb, Harry Passon, and Hughie Black, who wanted to keep their high school championship team together. The team's first season took place in the American League of Philadelphia, a minor league that comprised six area teams. They were sponsored by the Young Men's Hebrew Association of South Philadelphia and were called Philadelphia YMHA for that season. The team turned in a 4–11 record, tied for last in the league that year. After this season, each YMHA withdrew its support for the team, citing dissatisfaction with the game's violent nature.

Change to Sphas and "Wandering Jews" period
After losing their sponsorship from the YMHA, Gottlieb, Passon, and Black approached the South Philadelphia Hebrew Association about sponsoring the team. The association agreed to sponsor the men and provided funding for uniforms to the team. The new uniforms featured the acronym SPHA in Hebrew (ספהא) across the front. Again, their sponsorial relationship was short-lived, as the SPHA withdrew their sponsorship shortly after for an unspecified reason. The men had better financial solvency this time around, as they opened a sporting goods store, calling it P.G.B. Sporting Goods. With the store, they created new uniforms, but kept the Sphas moniker as a way of paying tribute to their upbringing. Douglas Stark, author of The SPHAS: The Life and Times of Basketball's Greatest Jewish Team, noted that "[f]or a number of years, the team was known as the Wandering Jews, because the team did not have its own home court." 

The team continued to play in the American League of Philadelphia after losing their partnership with the SPHA, and played in two different leagues during 1922–23 season: The Manufacturer's League, containing teams from area companies, and the Philadelphia League, which consisted of teams from the greater Philadelphia area, a number of them religious. In their single season in the Manufacturer's League, the team (known as Philadelphia Passon, Gottlieb, Black since they competed through Passon and Black's sporting goods store) turned in an overall 8–6 record, finishing 3rd in the first half of that season and 6th (out of 8) in the second half. Their first season in the Philadelphia League was a disappointing one, turning in an 8–11 record and finishing 2nd in the first half of the season, but last in the second half at 1–8. The  Sphas' next season in the Philadelphia League would prove more fruitful (due in part to the increased number of games), as the Sphas turned in a 25–15 record, overcoming a first-half slump of 14–13 (5th out of 8) to finish first in the second half of the season with an 11–3 record. They went on that year to defeat the Tri-Council Caseys 2–0 for their first championship.

Early championships, success against barnstorming teams, first ABL stint and name change
For the 1924–25 season, the Philadelphia League reconstituted itself as the Philadelphia Basket Ball League, dropping the number of teams in the league to six. The Sphas continued a strong spate of play, finishing 1st in the first half of the season, and third in the second half. They would go on to be repeat champions that season, winning 2–1 again over Tri-Council. Due to the success of the Sphas against teams in the Philadelphia area, and frustration with playing in the "poorly managed" Eastern League in 1924–25, owner Eddie Gottlieb set up games against professional teams from the newly-formed American Basketball League. The Sphas played a six-game stretch against the Brooklyn Arcadians, Fort Wayne Caseys, Cleveland Rosenblums, Washington Palace Five, and a team from New York's Metropolitan League, the Paterson Legionaires. The Sphas won five out of six games in this series, and Gottlieb subsequently scheduled games against two top barnstorming teams of the day, the Original Celtics and New York Renaissance. The Sphas defeated the Original Celtics 2–1 and swept the Rens, 2–0. The team's victories over these top barnstorming teams gave them increased notability in the burgeoning professional basketball community. Riding the wave of victories his team achieved against the ABL and barnstorming teams, Gottlieb entered the Sphas in the ABL, rechristening them the Philadelphia Warriors. During their two years in the ABL as the Warriors, the team performed moderately well, finishing third (14–7) and then fourth (10–11) in the 1926–27 season. For the 1927–28 season, the ABL split into two divisions (Eastern and Western). The Warriors played in the Eastern Division and finished third with a 30–21 record. This allowed them entry into the playoffs, where they lost to the New York Celtics 2–0.

Later years 
With the 1946 advent of the Basketball Association of America, the immediate predecessor of the NBA, the ABL became a minor-league, and the Sphas would remain there as a semi-professional team until 1949. 1949 would be the last year the Sphas were affiliated with a league, but thanks to Gottlieb's friendship with Abe Saperstein, president and owner of the Harlem Globetrotters, the Sphas lived on as one of the exhibition teams that the Globetrotters would play, although they would retain only the franchise name, not the Jewish makeup of the team.

Despite popular wisdom, the Sphas did not directly evolve into the Washington Generals. Instead, Saperstein had asked Red Klotz to create a separate exhibition team because the Sphas had beaten the Globetrotters on more than one occasion. After creating the Generals, Klotz sold the Sphas to one of his players, Pete Monska, who coached the team "for a year or two until it disbanded [in October 1959.]" The Sphas played their last game as the original team on October 17, 1959, losing to the Globetrotters in a double-header exhibition game. The Sphas were then reconstituted as the Baltimore Rockets, another Globetrotters exhibition team.

Season-by-season records

Players

References

 
1917 establishments in Pennsylvania
1955 disestablishments in Pennsylvania
Jewish-American history
Sports entertainment
Sports in Philadelphia
Defunct basketball teams in the United States